New York IRT may refer to:
 Interborough Rapid Transit Company, a defunct company that provided subway service in New York City from 1904–1940
 New York IRT (soccer team), a twentieth-century American soccer team sponsored by the aforementioned company